Susan Hallock Dey (born December 10, 1952) is a retired American actress, known for her television roles as Laurie Partridge on the sitcom The Partridge Family from 1970 to 1974, and as Grace Van Owen on the drama series L.A. Law from 1986 to 1992. A three-time Emmy Award nominee and six-time Golden Globe Award nominee, she won the Golden Globe for Best Actress in a Drama Series for L.A. Law in 1988.

Early life and education
Dey was born in Pekin, Illinois, to Ruth Pyle (née Doremus) Dey, a nurse, and Robert Smith Dey, an editor for the Standard-Star newspaper in New Rochelle, New York. Ruth died in 1961, when Susan was eight.

Dey attended Columbus Elementary School in Thornwood, New York. She later moved to Mount Kisco, New York, where she graduated from Fox Lane High School in 1970.

Career
Dey began her professional life as a model. Her first modeling break was the cover photo of a booklet by Pursettes tampons on first facts of menstruation for young girls, "Getting to Know Yourself".

She was cast as Laurie Partridge in the television series The Partridge Family from 1970 to 1974. She was 17 when she won the part with no previous acting experience. She returned to weekly network television in 1977 as the co-star of the short-lived sitcom Loves Me, Loves Me Not.

Dey's first film role was as a passenger in the 1972 airline hijack movie Skyjacked, starring Charlton Heston.  In a 1977 made-for-television movie, Mary Jane Harper Cried Last Night, she portrayed a disturbed young mother with serious psychological problems who begins to take them out on her toddler daughter. Also in 1977, Dey starred opposite William Katt in First Love, directed by Joan Darling and appeared in the Barnaby Jones episode "Testament of Power" (1977).

Dey co-starred with Albert Finney in the 1981 science-fiction film Looker, written and directed by Michael Crichton. She had a leading role in 1986's Echo Park as a struggling waitress-actress who takes a job as a stripper who delivers singing telegrams. She starred on L.A. Law from 1986 through 1992 as Los Angeles County deputy district attorney Grace Van Owen, who later became a judge. She won a Golden Globe Award as Actress in a Leading Role – Drama Series for the role in 1988. She was also nominated in each of the following four years. She was also nominated for the Emmy Award for Outstanding Lead Actress in a Drama Series in 1987, 1988, and 1989.

She hosted a 1992 episode of Saturday Night Live. Later that year, she co-starred in the sitcom Love & War. Although the show ran until 1995, Dey was replaced in 1993 by Annie Potts because producers reportedly felt she had "no chemistry" with co-star Jay Thomas. In 1993, Dey produced and starred in Lies & Lullabies (later released on DVD as Sad Inheritance), where she played a pregnant cocaine addict.

Dey was mentioned in Shirley Jones's memoir as the only cast member who "consistently refused" to take part in Partridge Family reunions.

In 1972, Dey was credited as the author of a book titled Susan Dey's Secrets on Boys, Beauty and Popularity.

Personal life

During the production of The Partridge Family, Dey had romantic feelings for co-star David Cassidy. They eventually pursued a relationship when the show ended, but Cassidy broke it off as he did not share her feelings. In 1994, Cassidy disclosed details of his relationship with Dey in his autobiography C'mon, Get Happy ... Fear and Loathing on the Partridge Family Bus; he presumed this led to her severing contact with him.

Dey was married to Leonard "Lenny" Hirshan from 1976 to 1981. They have one daughter, Sara, born in 1978. Dey has been married to television producer Bernard Sofronski since 1988.

She serves as a board member of the Rape Treatment Center at UCLA Medical Center, and co-narrated a documentary on campus rape with former L.A. Law co-star Corbin Bernsen. She suffered from the eating disorder anorexia during the run of The Partridge Family.

Filmography

Film

Television

References

Sources

External links

 
 
 

1952 births
Actresses from Illinois
Actresses from New York (state)
American child actresses
American film actresses
American television actresses
Best Drama Actress Golden Globe (television) winners
Female models from Illinois
Living people
People from Bedford, New York
People from Pekin, Illinois
20th-century American actresses
21st-century American actresses
Writers from Illinois